Oscar Fox (1 January 1921 – 15 January 1990) was an English footballer who played for Sheffield Wednesday and Mansfield Town primarily as a wing-half, but also sometimes as an inside-forward. He was the son of pre-war footballer Oscar Fox senior.

Fox began his career at Sheffield Wednesday, where he signed in October 1943, and made his peacetime first-team debut during the 1946–47 season. He played a total of 47 matches for the Owls, scoring four goals. In June 1950, he moved to Mansfield Town.

In his debut season for Mansfield, Fox was a member of the team that finished second in Division Three North, and was a regular member of the side for the next five years. In 1951–52, he scored a career-best ten goals.

Fox remained at Mansfield for the rest of his career, retiring from the game in May 1958, having played a total of 258 games for the Stags, scoring 34 goals. He was appointed assistant to manager Sam Weaver the following month, and remained in that role until Weaver was sacked in January 1960.

References

1921 births
1990 deaths
English footballers
Sheffield Wednesday F.C. players
Mansfield Town F.C. players
People from Clowne
Footballers from Derbyshire
Association football midfielders